Lactococcus laudensis  is a Gram-positive and non-spore-forming bacterium from the genus Lactococcus which has been isolated from raw cow milk from Val Trompia in Italy.

References

 

Streptococcaceae
Bacteria described in 2015
Milk